The 1932–33 season was the 58th season of competitive football in England. For the second time in three seasons, Arsenal were crowned league champions, building on a start of just one defeat in the first fourteen games. They clinched the crown with a 3–1 win at Chelsea in April 1933.  Meanwhile, Stoke City ended their nine-year wait for top flight promotion by attaining First Division status after winning an impressive 56 points over the campaign. Hull City and Brentford were also promoted. Everton won their second FA Cup defeating Manchester City 3–0 in the final. Lower league Walsall provided the surprise by knocking out Arsenal in an earlier round.

Events
5 November 1932 - Gillespie Road station on the London Underground - the station local to Arsenal Stadium - is renamed to Arsenal  (Highbury Hill), on the suggestion of Arsenal manager Herbert Chapman. By 1960, the station would become Arsenal tube station. It is the only Tube station named directly after a football club.

Honours

Notes = Number in parentheses is the times that club has won that honour. * indicates new record for competition

Football League

First Division

Second Division

Third Division North

Third Division South

Top goalscorers

First Division
Jack Bowers (Derby County) – 35 goals

Second Division
Ted Harper (Preston North End) – 37 goals

Third Division North
Bill McNaughton (Hull City) – 39 goals

Third Division South
Clarrie Bourton (Coventry City) – 40 goals

Notes

References